Line 14 (Onyx), formerly called the Airport Express, is a planned line of the Companhia Paulista de Trens Metropolitanos commuter rail system in São Paulo, Brazil which would originally connect the São Paulo-Guarulhos International Airport to Brás Station. The line was planned to have an average interval of six minutes between each station. 

On May 9, 2013, the Governor of São Paulo Geraldo Alckmin has cancelled the former project, as it seemed no longer viable due to the Federal Government project to establish the Rio–São Paulo high-speed rail. Line 14 would have a special fare estimated in R$ 30.00 (ten times higher than the normal CPTM fare, R$ 3.00 as of 2013). Alternatively the planned Line 13 (Jade) shall be extended up to the airport and keeping the same standard fare prevailing in all CPTM's lines. 

Although the State Government says that the current plan is to finish the constructions in progress, some preliminary details were revealed about the stations and character of the line.

Stations

2013 Proposal

Current Proposal

References

External links
 Official page of the CPTM
 Secretaria dos Transportes Metropolitanos

Companhia Paulista de Trens Metropolitanos
CPTM 14